Hale Eddy is a hamlet in Delaware County, New York, United States. It is located south-southeast of Deposit on NY Route 17. The West Branch Delaware River flows east through the hamlet.

References

Geography of Delaware County, New York
Hamlets in Delaware County, New York
Hamlets in New York (state)